Pauline 'Wendy' Woodhead (1916-2003) was a female former international table tennis player from England.

Table tennis career
She won a silver medal with Margaret Osborne in the women's doubles at the 1937 World Table Tennis Championships. The following year she won a gold medal at the 1938 World Table Tennis Championships with Laszlo Bellak. It was the first time they had paired together for a tournament.

She also won four English Open titles.

Personal life
Her father Percy William Woodhead owned a tennis court and table tennis room where she learnt to play. She married Martin 'Bunny' Burbush in 1940. She died in 2003, in Penrith, Cumbria.

Wendy & Martin had two children. Belinda & Timothy.

See also
 List of England players at the World Team Table Tennis Championships
 List of World Table Tennis Championships medalists

References

External links 
 History of USA Table Tennis Volume 1 - Chapter 27 Retrieved 2013-01-24

English female table tennis players
1916 births
2003 deaths